James Humphrey (October 9, 1811June 16, 1866) was a U.S. Representative from New York.

Born in Fairfield, Connecticut, Humphrey pursued classical studies under his father Heman Humphrey. He was graduated from Amherst College in 1831. He studied law.
He was admitted to the bar and practiced.
He moved to Louisville, Kentucky, in 1837 and one year later to Brooklyn, New York.

Humphrey was elected as a Republican to the Thirty-sixth Congress (March 4, 1859 – March 3, 1861).
He was an unsuccessful candidate for reelection in 1860 to the Thirty-seventh Congress and for election in 1862 to the Thirty-eighth Congress.

Humphrey was elected to the Thirty-ninth Congress and served from March 4, 1865, until his death in Brooklyn, New York, June 16, 1866.
He served as chairman of the Committee on Expenditures in the Department of the Navy (Thirty-ninth Congress).
He was interred in Greenwood Cemetery.

See also 
List of United States Congress members who died in office (1790–1899)

References

External links 
 

1811 births
1866 deaths
Burials at Green-Wood Cemetery
Amherst College alumni
Lawyers from Fairfield, Connecticut
Republican Party members of the United States House of Representatives from New York (state)
19th-century American politicians
19th-century American lawyers